Gagea pauciflora is an Asian  species of plants in the lily family. It is native to Mongolia, Russia (Primorye, Amur Oblast, Zabaykalsky Krai, Yakutia, Krasnoyarsk, Irkutsk, Altay Krai, Buryatia), and China (Gansu, Hebei, Heilongjiang, Inner Mongolia, Qinghai, Shaanxi, Tibet).

Gagea pauciflora is a bulb-forming perennial up to 30 cm tall. Flowers yellowish-green.
The specific epithet pauciflora, refers to the Latin term for 'few flowered'.

References

External links
Flora of China Illustrations vol. 24, fig. 103, drawings 1-3 at lower right line drawings of Gagea pauciflora
Plantarium, Gagea pauciflora Turcz. ex Ledeb. (семейство Liliaceae) Гусиный лук малоцветковый color photo, captions in Russian
FloraGREIF: University of Greifswald, Institute of Botany and Landscape Ecology, Institute of Geography and Geology, Computer Centre, 2010- (continuously updated). FloraGREIF - Virtual Flora of Mongolia (http://greif.uni-greifswald.de/floragreif/). Computer Centre of University of Greifswald, D-17487 Greifswald, Germany.  distribution map for Mongolia

pauciflora
Flora of Asia
Taxa named by Nikolai Turczaninow
Plants described in 1854